Hashan Harshana James (born 13 March 1993) is a Sri Lankan cricketer. He made his first-class debut for Sri Lanka Air Force Sports Club in Tier B of the 2016–17 Premier League Tournament on 2 December 2016. He made his Twenty20 debut for Sri Lanka Air Force Sports Club in the 2017–18 SLC Twenty20 Tournament on 24 February 2018. He made his List A debut for Sri Lanka Air Force Sports Club in the 2017–18 Premier Limited Overs Tournament on 14 March 2018.

References

External links
 

1993 births
Living people
Sri Lankan cricketers
Sri Lanka Air Force Sports Club cricketers
Place of birth missing (living people)